Embarrassing Moments may refer to:
 Embarrassing Moments (1930 film), an American comedy film
 Embarrassing Moments (1934 film), an American comedy film